Milton is a given name, and may refer to:

People:
Milton Acorn (1923–1986), Canadian poet, writer, and playwright
Milton Ager (1893–1979), American composer
Milton Avery (1885–1965), American modern painter
Milton Babbitt (1916–2011), American composer
Milton Bagby, American voice actor and author
Milton Balkany (born 1946), American Orthodox rabbi and convicted extortionist
Milton Barney (born 1963), American football player
Mílton Barros (born 1984), Angolan basketball player
Milton Bearden (born 1940), retired Central Intelligence Agency officer, author, and film consultant
Milton Becerra (born 1951), Venezuelan artist
Milton Earl Beebe (1840–1923), American architect
Milton Bell (born 1970), American basketball player
Milton Berle (1908–2002), American comedian
Milton Blanco (born 1984), American soccer player 
Milton Bradley (1836–1911), American toymaker
Milton Bradley (baseball) (born 1978), American baseball player
Milton Brown (1903–1936), American band leader and vocalist
Milton Brown (politician) (1804–1883), U.S. Representative from Tennessee
Milton Campbell (born 1976), American track and field athlete
Milton A. Candler (1837–1909), American lawyer, Confederate officer, and politician
Milton Caniff (1907–1988), American cartoonist
Milton Caraglio (born 1988), Argentine footballer
Milton Coleman (born 1946), American journalist
Milton Crenchaw (1919–2015), American aviator
Milton Cross (1897–1975), American radio announcer 
Milton DeLugg (1918–2015), American jazz accordionist, bandleader and composer
Milton Diamond (born 1934), American sexologist
Milton Doyle (born 1993), American basketball player
Milton Dube, Nauruan politician
Milton Ellenby, American bridge player
Milton H. Erickson (1901–1980), American psychiatrist
Milton Estes (1914–1963), American country singer-songwriter and musician
Milton Ezrati, American economist
Milton Fisher (1917–2001), American attorney and investment banker
Milton Flores (1974–2003), Honduran footballer
Milton Friedman (1912–2006), American economist
Milton Frome (1909–1989), American actor
Milton Galamison (1923–1988), American Presbyterian minister and civil rights activist
Milton C. Garber (1867–1948), American politician
Milton Glaser (1929–2020), American graphic designer
Milton Glick (1937–2011), American educator
Milton Goldstein (film executive) (born 1926), American film executive
Milton Goldstein (photographer) (1915–2000), American photographer
Milton Goode (born 1960), American high jumper
Milton Green, (1913–2005), American sportsperson (high hurdler) in the 1930s
Milton Fowler Gregg (1892–1978), Canadian military officer 
Milton Hay (1817–1893), American lawyer and politician
Milton S. Hershey (1857–1945), American chocolatier and philanthropist
Milton B. Hine (1828–1881), American politician
Milton Huddart (1960–2015), English rugby league footballer 
R. Milton Johnson, American businessman and philanthropist
Milton Jones (born 1964), English comedian
Milton Kerker (1920–2016), American physical chemist
 Milton Marx, given name of Gummo Marx (1893–1977), American actor, comedian, and theatrical agent
Milton McGriggs, American football player
Milton Mallawarachchi (1944-1998), Sri Lankan Sinhala vocalist
Milton E. Miles (1900–1961), American U.S. Navy admiral
Milton Morris (1924–2019), Australian politician
Milton Nascimento (born 1942), Brazilian singer-songwriter
Milton Obote (1925–2005), Ugandan politician
J. A. Milton Perera (1929-1991), Sri Lankan Sinhala playback singer and composer
Milton Prell (1905–1974), American hotel and casino developer
Milton D. Purdy (1866–1937), American federal judge
Milton Ernest Ricketts (1913–1942), American naval officer
Milton A. Romjue (1874–1968), American politician
Milton Romney (1899–1975), American football player
Milton A. Rothman (1919–2001), American nuclear physicist
Milton Selzer (1918–2006) American stage, film, and television actor
Milton Dean Slaughter, American theoretical physicist
Milton Stapp (1792–1869), American politician
Milton Vieira (born 1978), Brazilian mixed martial artist
Milton Williams (born 1999), American football player
Milton Wynants (born 1972), Uruguayan cyclist
Milton Wynn (born 1978), American football player

Pseudonyms:
 Milton, stage name of Marc Rosenthal, American singer-songwriter

Fictional characters:
Milton (The Suicide Squad), a character in The Suicide Squad
Milton Calypeer, a character in the 2006 animated film Cars
 Milton Fludgecow, a character from the Crotchety Old Man Calls series of prank calls from the MJ Morning Show in Tampa, Florida
Milton Krest, a villain in the James Bond short story "The Hildebrand Rarity"
Milton Mamet, a character in the television series The Walking Dead
Milton Waddams, a character in the 1999 comedy film Office Space

See also
Milt (name), a list of people, nearly all with the real given name Milton